Bianca Stigter is a Dutch film director from Amsterdam.
She directed Three Minutes: A Lengthening.

She is married to director Steve McQueen, and was associate producer on his film 12 Years a Slave.

References

External links

Living people
Year of birth missing (living people)
Dutch film directors
People from Amsterdam
21st-century Dutch women